Marc Ravalomanana  (born 12 December 1949) is a Malagasy politician who was the President of Madagascar from 2002 to 2009. Born into a farming Merina family in Imerinkasinina, near the capital city of Antananarivo, Ravalomanana first rose to prominence as the founder and CEO of the vast dairy conglomerate TIKO, later launching successful wholesaler MAGRO and several additional companies.

He entered politics upon founding the Tiako Iarivo political party in 1999 and successfully ran for the position of mayor of Antananarivo, holding the position from 1999 to 2001. As mayor he improved sanitary and security conditions in the city. In August 2001 he announced his candidacy as an independent in the December 2001 presidential election. He then took office as president in 2002 amidst a dispute over election results in which he successfully pressed his claim to have won a majority in the first round. Under the leadership of Jacques Sylla, Ravalomanana's Prime Minister from 2002 to 2007, the political party Tiako I Madagasikara (TIM) was founded in 2002 to support Ravalomanana's presidency and came to dominate legislative and local elections. He was re-elected in December 2006, again with a majority in the first round.

During Ravalomanana's presidency, Madagascar made significant advances toward development targets and experienced an average of seven per cent growth per year. His administration oversaw the construction of thousands of new schools and health clinics. Road rehabilitation aided in improving rural farmers' access to markets. The establishment of the independent anti-corruption agency BIANCO, and the adoption of diverse supporting policies resulted in a decline in government corruption. The acreage of natural areas under protection expanded in fulfillment of Ravalomanana's "Madagascar Naturally" development program. The 2007 release of Ravalomanana's comprehensive development strategy, the Madagascar Action Plan, set targets and goals for national development over his second term in the areas of governance, infrastructure, agriculture, health, economy, environment and national solidarity.

Opposition members criticized Ravalomanana in the later period of his presidency, accusing him of increasing authoritarianism and the mixing of public and private interests. In addition, the benefits of the country's growth were not evenly spread, leading to increased wealth inequality, inflation and a decline in purchasing power for the lower and middle classes. In 2008 a controversial land lease agreement with Korean agricultural firm Daewoo, the purchase of a costly presidential jet and the closure of media channels owned by opposition leader and mayor of Antananarivo, Andry Rajoelina, strengthened popular disapproval of his policies. Rajoelina rallied popular support for the opposition, leading to a popular uprising that began in January 2009 and ended two months later with Ravalomanana's resignation under pressure and Rajoelina taking control with military support in a power transfer viewed by the international community as a coup d'état.

From 2009 to 2012 Ravalomanana lived in exile in South Africa, where he was engaged in active negotiations with Rajoelina and former heads of state Albert Zafy and Didier Ratsiraka to organize national elections. In December 2012 he declared he would not present himself as a candidate, then a precondition to the elections being viewed as legitimate by the international community. TGV candidate Hery Rajaonarimampianina was elected president in January 2014, defeating Jean-Louis Robinson, the candidate of Marc Ravalomanana's camp. Upon attempting to return to Madagascar in October 2014 he was arrested, having been sentenced in absentia to lifelong hard labour for abuses of power by the Rajoelina administration. After his sentence was lifted and he was freed from house arrest in May 2015, Ravalomanana announced the re-opening of the Tiko business group and was re-elected the president of TIM.

Early years 
Ravalomanana's parents worked as peddlers before opening a small shop in a rural village in Tamatave Province. Anticipating the regional violence that erupted during the 1947 Malagasy Uprising against French colonial rule, the family relocated to a village near their ancestral lands outside Antananarivo. Once resettled in the highlands, Ravalomanana's mother worked as a seamstress in addition to assisting her husband with farming their land.

Ravalomanana's family origins are Merina, the island's largest and most politically prominent ethnic group. The Ravalomanana family tomb is outside the historic walls of the village, a placement that would typically indicate the family's origins lie with the hova (commoners' caste), rather than the andriana – the traditional ruling caste among the Merina that continues to exert considerable influence over political affairs in modern Madagascar. His later entry into the political sphere has made the question of his caste background one of popular interest and ongoing debate among the Malagasy public and press. Biographer Vivier (2007) maintains that the Ravalomanana family is andriana in origin.

From a young age he regularly attended the Church of Jesus Christ in Madagascar (FJKM), a Reformed Protestant church and, with 2.5 million adherents, the most important religious association in Madagascar. As a youth he sang in the choir and later taught catechism.

He walked this distance daily, often departing early with baskets of watercress to sell to train passengers at the nearby station. He completed his upper primary schooling at the Protestant missionary-run Vinet private school in Ambohimalaza, where his mother arranged for him to live with a host family. After completing his primary studies he attended the Swedish missionary-run technical secondary school in Ambatomanga. He lived with one of his brothers and began producing and selling yogurt in individual serving pots to local villagers and students as a means to subsidize his studies. During this time he met his future wife, Lalao Rakotonirainy, a classmate at the secondary school. In 1972, in a climate of increasing political instability and widespread school-based protests against the Tsiranana administration, Ravalomanana dropped out of the school's eleventh grade program at the age of 23; he then pursued further technical training in Fianarantsoa. He participated in NGO-sponsored entrepreneurship training in Sweden and Germany, and business studies in Denmark underwritten by the Danish ambassador. After returning to Madagascar, he wed Lalao on 12 November 1974; their marriage produced one daughter and three sons.

Entrepreneur 
Upon completing his studies, Ravalomanana returned to Manjakandriana District, where he and his family began making and selling homemade yogurts, a common artisanal product in the highlands region. On his bicycle, he collected milk from farmers in neighboring towns, gradually increasing his production and clientele. He opened his first yogurt and cheese production center in 1977 in Sambaina on land he named Rova-Tiko ("Tiko Palace"), where he would build the first Tiko factory several years later. His wife handled the administrative and accounting side of the business from Ankadivato, where the storage facility for finished products was located. By the end of the 1970s, Ravalomanana's dairy business employed five salaried staff members and was distributing its products in stores across Antananarivo.

Ravalomanana solicited a loan from the Agence Française de Développement to further expand his business, but this request was denied, souring his view of France. His subsequent request to the World Bank for 1.5 million US dollars was approved, and in 1982 he founded the Tiko company. The representative of the World Bank to Madagascar at the time, José Broffman, secured the loan with exceptionally favorable reimbursement conditions that enabled Ravalomanana to sell his products at a lower cost than other small dairy producers, which gradually put his most significant competitors out of business. Broffman later left his post at the World Bank to become a principal investor in the company, joined by private investors from South Africa, Germany and the United States. As Tiko continued to grow, the entrepreneur began incorporating imported ingredients such as powdered milk from South Africa (constituting 80 per cent of the composition of Tiko dairy products) and surplus butter from Europe, further improving the profitability of his business and enabling additional diversification. Tiko Group first concentrated exclusively on the production of dairy products before expanding into fruit juices, ice cream, cooking oil and carbonated beverages. The Tiko slogan printed on many of the group's products, Vita Malagasy ("Made in Madagascar"), reflected Ravalomanana's national pride and his vision that Madagascar should develop a larger capacity to produce quality goods for distribution for national and international markets.

Ravalomanana cultivated political relationships to facilitate the continued growth of Tiko in spite of an economic climate non-conducive to free enterprise under the Socialist administration of Ratsiraka. Early support in the 1980s came from the Supreme Counselor of the Revolution Manandafy Rakotonirina, then-Minister of Finance Rakotovao Razakaboana, and another minister, Justin Rarivoson. By the mid-1980s, the profitability of his Tiko enterprise enabled Ravalomanana to purchase a costly villa formerly owned by French colonial governor Leon Reallon in the central Faravohitra neighborhood of Antananarivo.

In 1997, under the pretext of concern about mad cow disease, Ratsiraka obstructed Ravalomanana's plans to build a farm stocked with imported high-yield milk cows. Ravalomanana overcame the objection by breeding high-yield cows locally, thereby further boosting Tiko production. Later that same year, Ratsiraka's daughters began competing with Tiko by importing and reselling vegetable oil under the brand name "Eden". When Norbert Ratsirahonana declared himself a candidate in the 1997 presidential elections against Ratsiraka and Albert Zafy, Ravalomanana provided significant financial contributions to the Ratsirahonana campaign in return for tax exemptions on his edible oil products for a period of five years. The profits he consequently earned were reinvested to create the Magro wholesale company in 1998. By 2001, over a dozen principal warehouses throughout the country enabled widespread distribution of Tiko products to urban and rural areas, with a flagship warehouse in the Akorandrano neighborhood of Antananarivo.

The Ratsiraka administration launched an inquiry into Tiko business practices in September 2000 and issued an executive decision in June 2001 that the company should be shut down for failure to adhere to a 1996 agreement requiring Tiko to create jobs and produce low-cost vegetable oil; this ruling was overturned by the Supreme Court on 16 October 2002. A number of lawsuits have been filed over Ravalomanana's business practices, including a court judgment on the eve of the 2001 presidential election requiring the payment of between 200 and 363 billion Malagasy francs in Tiko back taxes, but all were either dismissed or ended in an out-of-court settlement; none resulted in a criminal conviction.

At its height during the period of Ravalomanana's presidency, Tiko provided direct salaried employment to between 1,000 and 3,000 staff and indirect employment to over 10,000. The group was the largest dairy producer in the country and a leader in the national agribusiness sector. The success of his enterprises made Ravalomanana a wealthy man. In the mandatory self-disclosure of wealth submitted to the High Constitutional Court in 2000 by all presidential candidates, Ravalomanana declared ownership of 27 properties valued at over two billion Malagasy francs. He owned 90 per cent of Tiko Inc., 80 per cent of Tiko Agri and 50 per cent of Tiko Oil Products, a portfolio worth 13.1 billion Malagasy francs, and declared 77 million Malagasy francs in annual revenues. Vivier (2007) demonstrates that the valuation of Ravalomanana's holdings and his annual revenue in particular were significantly underestimated.

Mayor of Antananarivo 
In 1999, Ravalomanana decided to register as an independent candidate in the Antananarivo mayoral election rather than finance a representative from another party. The president of the Judged by Your Work Party (AVI), Norbert Lala Ratsirahonana, had met the entrepreneur several years prior in relation to Tiko business matters. The two discussed the possibility that Ravalomanana could run as an AVI candidate, but this idea was abandoned. His principal opponent, former Prime Minister Guy Willy Razanamasy of the Association for the Rebirth of Madagascar (AREMA party), suffered from low popularity, leading Ratsiraka to tacitly support Ravalomanana's candidature against the representative of his own party. By contrast, Ravalomanana was an unknown, attracting attention primarily for his considerable success in employment and wealth creation through Tiko, and his esteemed role as Vice President of the Church of Jesus Christ in Madagascar, which was vocal in its support for the candidate.

Supporters among Ravalomanana's high-level Tiko staff established a group to promote his campaign, which he named Tiako Iarivo ("I Love Antananarivo"). The candidate spent over 700 million Malagasy francs on the campaign, drawn from the proceeds of his business and private donations. His campaign staff widely distributed promotional posters featuring the candidate's face, name and slogan, and handed out free Tiko yogurts and boxes of milk to the public. Ravalomanana's campaign posters often featured the Tiko logo and images of the candidate riding a bicycle laden with milk canisters to play on his image as a simple and poor farmer who, through intelligence, determination and responsible management, succeeded in developing a thriving business and would apply these same skills to develop the capital city. The Ravalomanana campaign received support on the basis of his evident success as a manager, his leadership in the Christian community and his non-alignment with Ratsiraka's AREMA party, as well as his relative youthfulness and physical attractiveness to female voters. The campaign opened on 2 November 1999, and by 8 November Ravalomanana held a led in the polls. In the 14 November municipal elections, Ravalomanana was elected mayor of Antananarivo with 45 per cent of the votes.

Upon being elected mayor, Ravalomanana prioritized sanitation, security and public administration in the capital city. Provided a budget of approximately 11 million US dollars to manage Antananarivo, Ravalomanana took initiative to secure additional funds. He established a bank account for public and business contributions to city improvement projects, raising over $700,000 in six months. He obtained funds from international donors to establish garbage collection and disposal systems, restore dilapidated infrastructure such as roads and marketplaces and replant public gardens. He received regular guidance and council from Kurt Schmoke, recently Mayor of Baltimore, Maryland, with whom he had developed a friendship through his biannual business trips to the United States as CEO of Tiko. To improve sanitation conditions in the city, he constructed public latrines in densely populated or highly frequented areas. During his tenure, construction in the capital increased sharply, with twelve new supermarkets constructed in two years. Ravalomanana launched an initiative to install or repair street lights throughout the city to improve nighttime safety. He increased the number of police officers on the streets, leading to a drop in crime. His relationship with President Ratsiraka remained good through his early tenure as mayor, although his decision on 28 June 2001 to eliminate "red zones" – areas of the city where public assembly and protests were prohibited – provoked Ratsiraka's strong disapproval.

In an August 2000 interview with the San Francisco Chronicle, Ravalomanana expressed the belief that development in Madagascar would require greater personal responsibility among the Malagasy populace, a better business environment, environmental protection and reduced corruption. In response to increasing media speculation that he could be a strong candidate for the presidency, he stated that he was ambivalent toward the prospect, declaring "I miss the freedom of business, the ease of getting things done."

Presidency

Presidential election of 2001 

On 5 August 2001, in front of the FJKM church in his village of birth, Ravalomanana announced his intent to run for president in the election to be held on 16 December. His campaign promoted his image as a self-made man who would draw upon his business acumen to develop the country and played upon his relative youth (he was then aged 52) and his non-alliance with the elderly "political dinosaurs" who had dominated politics over the previous three decades. His humble origins as a village farmer inspired support among rural voters, who made up over four-fifths of the population. He was seen as the embodiment of the meritocracy many voters wished to see established in Madagascar in place of corrupt power networks dominated by nepotism. The Counsel of Christian Churches of Madagascar (FFKM) rallied behind Ravalomanana, whose electoral slogan was "Don't be afraid, but have faith." Ravalomanana received counsel and support for his campaign from the former mayor of Baltimore and a director of former US President Bill Clinton's campaign.

Ravalomanana's announcement sparked retaliatory actions by the Ratsiraka administration, resulting in frequent defamatory attacks in the press and a court judgment fining him 300 billion Malagasy francs (55.6 million Euros) in unpaid back taxes, and two other lawsuits in relation to his management of Tiko, which were later settled out of court. These attacks were denounced by spokesmen for Ravalomanana's campaign support network, Tiako iMadagasikara (TIM), and in speeches the candidate delivered in urban and rural areas across the island, with travel made possible by his considerable personal wealth and the airplane and seven distribution helicopters registered to Tiko. Tiko distribution channels were used to distribute posters, baseball caps, tee-shirts and other promotional materials.

October 2001 polls showed Ravalomanana ahead of Ratsiraka. Following the December election, official results put Ravalomanana in first place, with 46 per cent, against Ratsiraka's 40 per cent; without a majority, a run-off would be required between the two candidates. Ravalomanana, claiming to have won a majority in the first round, refused to participate in a run-off, instead demanding that the High Constitutional Court review the votes. Ratsiraka's supporters then blockaded the capital, which Ravalomanana's supporters controlled. Ravalomanana declared himself president on 22 February 2002. After a recount, on 29 April 2002 the High Constitutional Court declared that Ravalomanana had won 51.3 percent of the vote, enough for a narrow first-round victory. Je was sworn in on 6 May. Ravalomanana dispatched soldiers to bring pockets of resistance under control, with incidents of unrest continuing until Ratsiraka fled into exile on 5 July 2002 after losing control of most of the country's provinces.

First term 

Upon election to the presidency, Ravalomanana sought to mitigate the negative economic impact of the eight-month political standoff with Ratsiraka, which had cost Madagascar millions of dollars in lost tourism and trade revenue as well as damage to infrastructure, including bombed bridges and buildings damaged by arson. He enacted a series of new laws, policies and reforms that sought to efface remaining traces of Ratsiraka's socialist ideology and replace it with a firmly capitalist, market-driven economic environment.  In a break with tradition, the new head of state moved away from reliance on its principal trading partner, France, and cultivated relationships with partners such as Germany, the United States and South Korea as part of his strategy for Madagascar's economic development. He partnered with advisers at Harvard University to launch a rapid results initiative designed to spur rapid economic growth. In 2004 the World Bank approved his administration's Poverty Reduction Strategy Paper, entitled Madagascar Naturellement (Madagascar Naturally), in which he enshrined the principle of environmental conservation as inseparable from sustainable economic growth. The negative economic impact of the political crisis was gradually overcome by Ravalomanana's progressive economic and political policies, which encouraged investments in education and ecotourism, facilitated foreign direct investment and cultivated trading partnerships both regionally and internationally.

In 2004 he established BIANCO (Bureau Indépendant Anti-Corruption), an anti-corruption bureau, which resulted in reduced corruption among Antananarivo's lower-level bureaucrats in particular, although high-level officials have not been prosecuted by the bureau. That same year, the International Monetary Fund agreed to write off half Madagascar's debt. Having met a set of stringent economic, governance and human rights criteria, in 2005 Madagascar became the first country to benefit from the Millennium Challenge Account, a new development fund managed by the United States. Legal reforms strengthened state institutions, particularly the judiciary, and produced improvements in human rights, civil liberties and the business climate. Consequently, the economy grew at an average annual rate of seven per cent throughout his presidency. Under his administration, hundreds of kilometers of roads were paved in formerly isolated rural areas. Dramatic improvements in education and health were also achieved under his administration. During Ravalomanana's first term, thousands of new primary schools and additional classrooms were constructed, older buildings were renovated and tens of thousands of new primary teachers were recruited and trained. Primary school fees were eliminated and kits containing basic school supplies were distributed to primary students. Logging in protected areas was outlawed until January 2009.

After being elected president in 2002, Ravalomanana remained a prominent player in the private sector. The 2003 privatisation of SINPA (Societe d'lnteret National Malgache des Produits Agricoles), the state agricultural corporation, and SOMACODIS (Société Malgache de Collecte et de Distribution), the national trading corporation, provided Ravalomanana the opportunity to purchase both entities, which he incorporated under Tiko. He also created a public roads construction company, Asa Lalana Malagasy.

The benefits of economic growth during the Ravalomanana administration were not evenly distributed, leading to higher costs of living for all Malagasy and a deepening poverty among much of the population with fewer able to increase their wealth. Detractors indicate a decline in purchasing power and dramatic inflation early in Ravalomanana's presidency as evidence of a failure to reduce poverty. Ravalomanana's critics remarked that the greatest beneficiary of his reforms and policies was the president himself, giving the example of road construction projects that enabled Tiko to distribute more efficiently as well as the farmers and other small businesspeople targeted by the initiative. Furthermore, his own companies tended to be awarded most of the government contracts for which they bid, although this occurred transparently and legally, due to a weak legal framework around conflict of interest. Critics condemned his tendency to make unilateral decisions and disregard the views of his entourage, a number of whom resigned or were dismissed. Many joined an opposition movement that had gained considerable strength by late 2007.

On 18 November 2006, Ravalomanana's jet was forced to divert from Madagascar's capital during a return trip from Europe following reports of a coup underway in Antananarivo and shooting near the airport. The attempted coup was ultimately unsuccessful.

Presidential election of 2006 

Ravalomanana ran for a second term in the presidential election held on 3 December 2006. According to official results, he won the election with 54.79 per cent of the vote in the first round; his best results were in Antananarivo Province, where he received the support of 75.39 per cent of voters. He was sworn in for his second term on 19 January 2007.

Second term 
During his second term, Ravalomanana oversaw revisions to the Poverty Reduction Strategy Paper. Renamed the Madagascar Action Plan (MAP), this new strategy was intended to build on the successes of his first term to accelerate and expand national development. The plan focused on "the eight commitments": accountable governance, more extensive and interconnected infrastructure, agriculture based rural development, family planning and health (particularly fighting HIV/AIDS), strong economic growth, environmental protection, and the traditional principle of fihavanana (solidarity). The plan's targets were aligned with the United Nations' Millennium Development Goals.

As construction of schools and hiring of teachers continued in Ravalomanana's second term, additional measures were adopted to improve education quality, including a shift to Malagasy as the language of instruction in grades one to five, expansion of primary schools to house grades six and seven for greater access to lower secondary schooling and an overhaul of the national curriculum, which had been modified piecemeal since independence from France in 1960. In the Constitution of 2007, English was added to Malagasy and French as an official language, in reflection of Ravalomanana's goal to increase Madagascar's participation in the global market.

In the later half of his second term, Ravalomanana was criticized by domestic and international observers, who accused him of increasing authoritarianism and corruption.

Confrontation with Rajoelina 

On 13 December 2008, the government closed Viva TV, owned by mayor of Antananarivo Andry Rajoelina, stating that a Viva interview with exiled former head of state Didier Ratsiraka was "likely to disturb peace and security". This move catalyzed the political opposition and a public already dissatisfied with other recent actions undertaken by Ravalomanana, including a July 2008 deal with Daewoo Logistics to lease half the island's arable land for South Korean cultivation of corn and palm oil, and the November 2008 purchase of a second presidential jet at a cost of 60 million U.S. dollars. Within a week, Rajoelina met with twenty of Madagascar's most prominent opposition leaders (referred to in the press as the "Club of 20"), to develop a joint statement demanding that the Ravalomanana administration improve its adherence to democratic principles. The demand was broadcast at a press conference, where Rajoelina promised to dedicate a politically open public space in the capital, which he would call Place de la democratie ("Democracy Square").

Beginning in January 2009, Rajoelina led a series of political rallies in downtown Antananarivo where he gave voice to the frustration that Ravalomanana's policies had triggered, particularly among the economically marginalized and members of the political opposition. On 3 February, Ravalomanana dismissed Rajoelina as mayor of Antananarivo and appointed a special delegation headed by Guy Randrianarisoa to manage the affairs of the capital. Rajoelina incited demonstrators on 7 February to occupy the president's office in Ambohitsorohitra Palace in central Antananarivo. The presidential guard opened fire on the advancing crowd, killing 31 and wounding more than 200. Ravalomanana became the third president since independence (after Ratsiraka and Philibert Tsiranana) to allow the defense forces to shoot at civilians; several months later, at a demonstration led by Ravalomanana supporters, Rajoelina would become the fourth president to authorize such an action. Popular disapproval of Ravalomanana intensified and polarized some in favor of his resignation, although perceptions of Rajoelina as an alternative remained mixed. Conflicts between pro-Rajoelina demonstrators and security forces continued over the following weeks, resulting in several additional deaths.
On 11 March, following a declaration of neutrality by army leadership, pro-opposition soldiers from the Army Corps of Personnel and Administrative and Technical Services (CAPSAT) stormed the army headquarters and forced the army chief of staff to resign. Over the next several days the army deployed forces to enable the opposition to occupy key ministries, the chief of military police transferred his loyalty to Rajoelina and the army sent tanks against the president's Iavoloha Palace. Rajoelina rejected Ravalomanana's offer on 15 March to hold a national referendum to determine whether the president should resign, and called on security forces to arrest the president. The following day, the army stormed the Ambohitsorohitra Palace and captured the Central Bank. Hours later, Ravalomanana transferred his power to a group of senior army personnel, an act described by the opposition as a voluntary resignation. Ravalomanana later declared he had been forced at gunpoint to relinquish power. The military council would have been charged with organizing elections within 24 months and re-writing the constitution for the "Fourth Republic". However, Vice Admiral Hyppolite Ramaroson announced on 18 March that the council would transfer power directly to Rajoelina, making him president of the opposition-dominated High Transitional Authority (HAT) that he had appointed weeks earlier. With the military's backing, the HAT was charged with taking up the tasks previously accorded to Ravalomanana's proposed military directorate. Madagascar's constitutional court deemed the transfer of power, from Ravalomanana to the military board and then to Rajoelina, to be legal; the court's statement did not include a justification for its decision. Rajoelina was sworn in as president on 21 March at Mahamasina Municipal Stadium before a crowd of 40,000 supporters, a transfer of power that was considered illegitimate and unconstitutional by the international community and widely described in the press as a coup d'état.

Post-presidency 
After coming to power, Rajoelina's HAT pursued legal action against Ravalomanana. On 2 June 2009, Ravalomanana was fined 70 million US dollars (42 million British pounds) and sentenced to four years in prison for alleged abuse of office which, according to HAT Justice Minister Christine Razanamahasoa, included the December 2008 purchase of a presidential jet worth $60 million. Razanamahasoa claimed Ravalomanana "mixed public interests with his personal interests". The former head of state was in exile in Swaziland at the time, having been prevented from returning to Madagascar the previous month. Additionally, on 28 August, Ravalomanana was sentenced in absentia to hard labour for life for his role in the protests and ensuing deaths. Arrest warrants were also issued for General Heriniaina Roelina and Colonel Anatole Ramlamboarison. Ravalomanana's Tiko Group faced heavy pressure from the transitional government, which in April 2009 demanded that the company pay 35 million US dollars in back taxes or risk being shut down.

The AU and SADC set up a Troika, headed by King Mswati of Swaziland, to mediate the conflict. Both Ravalomanana and Rajoelina were requested by the Southern African Development Community (SADC) to renounce participation in the 2013 Malagasy presidential elections in order to hasten an end to the ongoing political crisis. On 10 December 2012, Ravalomanana announced that he would not participate in the elections, and encouraged Rajoelina to follow suit, in line with SADC recommendations. Rajoelina complied; however, when Ravalomanana's wife Lalao submitted her candidacy several months later, Rajoelina resubmitted his candidacy, declaring that Marc Ravalomanana sought to govern by proxy through his wife. In August 2013, a special electoral court invalidated the candidacy of Lalao Ravalomanana, as well as her chief competitors Rajoelina and Ratsiraka. TGV candidate Hery Rajaonarimampianina was elected president in January 2014, defeating Jean-Louis Robinson, the candidate of Marc Ravalomanana's camp. Upon attempting to return to Madagascar in October 2014 Ravalomanana was arrested, having been sentenced in absentia to lifelong hard labour for abuses of power by the Rajoelina administration. After his sentence was lifted and he was freed from house arrest in May 2015, Ravalomanana recommenced broadcasts at his MBS radio station, announced the re-opening of the TIKO business group, and was re-elected the president of TIM.

Other activities 
Ravalomanana is known for his fervent Christian faith. As a young adult he gradually took on increasingly responsible leadership roles within his church community. In early 2000 he replaced a member of the eastern Antananarivo synod in its Christian Men's Committee and was quickly elected its president. In August the same year he was elected as head layman and Vice-President of the FJKM. In 2005, he was quoted as saying that he "dream[s] of a Christian nation", a vision that critics considered a violation of the constitution, which described the state as secular. A 2007 constitutional referendum removed this descriptor, among other changes. While Ravalomanana enjoyed strong support from the FJKM and other church organizations early in his political career, these organizations placed increasing pressure on him over time, viewing his policies as inadequately effective in reducing poverty across the island.

Ravalomanana owns media group Malagasy Broadcasting System (MBS), which operates radio and television stations.

Honours

National honours
:
 Grand Cross, First Class of the National Order of Madagascar

Foreign honours
:
 Grand Cross Special Class of the Order of Merit of the Federal Republic of Germany (2006)
:
 Grand Commander of the Most Distinguished Order of the Star and Key of the Indian Ocean (2008)

Honorary degrees
 Honorary Doctorate from University of Antananarivo (2007)
 Honorary Doctorate of Law from Abilene Christian University, Texas (2008)

Further reading

References 

|-

1949 births
Living people
People from Analamanga
Malagasy Protestants
Merina people
Presidents of Madagascar
Malagasy businesspeople
Grand Commanders of the Order of the Star and Key of the Indian Ocean
Mayors of Antananarivo
Grand Crosses Special Class of the Order of Merit of the Federal Republic of Germany
Tiako I Madagasikara politicians
Exiled politicians
Heads of government who were later imprisoned
Recipients of orders, decorations, and medals of Madagascar